Herodion is a popular mispronunciation of Herodeion, the Greek name of Herodium, a hill, palace-fortress, and town named after King Herod the Great.

Heodion is also an ancient Greek given name that may refer to 
Herodion of Antioch (died AD 136), Christian martyr and Bishop of Antioch
Herodion of Patras, a Christian saint and relative of Saint Paul

Masculine given names